Davis Creek is a stream in the U.S. state of West Virginia. It is a tributary of the Guyandotte River.

Davis Creek has the name of Paul H. Davis, a local pioneer.

See also
List of rivers of West Virginia

References

Rivers of Cabell County, West Virginia
Rivers of West Virginia